Hans Christian Nelson (October 25, 1886 - May 29, 1939) Served as a member of the California State Assembly for the 2nd district from 1913 to 1915, he also served in the California State Senate, representing the 1st District from 1921 to 1933.

References

Republican Party members of the California State Assembly
Republican Party California state senators
20th-century American politicians
1886 births
1939 deaths